Events in the year 1918 in Bulgaria.

Incumbents

Events 

 29 September – The Armistice of Salonica (also known as the Armistice of Thessalonica) was signed between Bulgaria and the Allied Powers in Thessaloniki.

References 

 
1910s in Bulgaria
Years of the 20th century in Bulgaria
Bulgaria
Bulgaria